Kopano Ratele is a cultural psychologist and men and masculinities studies scholar. He is known for his work on African psychology, masculinity, fatherhood, culture, sexuality, and violence. He is former co-director of the South African Medical Research Council-University of South Africa (Unisa)'s Violence, Injury & Peace Research Unit. In 2009-2010 he was president of the Psychological Society of South Africa. He chaired the board of Sonke Gender Justice, a South African nongovernmental organisation working across Africa to strengthen government, civil society and citizen capacity to promote gender equality, prevent domestic and sexual violence, and reduce the spread and impact of HIV and AIDS.

He is a regular contributor to media on matters related to boys, men and masculinity, violence, and fatherhood. In 2017-2018 he co-hosted a weekly radio show on fatherhood, CapeTalk Dads, on The Koketso Sachane Show with Koketso Sachane and Mbuyiselo Botha on CapeTalk Radio. In 2021-2022 he co-hosted a fatherhood feature with Koketso Sachane on SAFM's The Meeting Point.

Ratele was previously professor at the University of the Western Cape. He then joined the Institute for Social and Health Sciences at the [[University of South Africa (Unisa)]] where he ran the Research Unit on Men & Masculinities and the Transdisciplinary African Psychologies Programme. During the same period he was researcher and co-director of the South African Medical Research Council (SAMRC)-Unisa the Violence, Injury & Peace Research Unit. He was the director of the SAMRC-Unisa Masculinity and Health Research Unit. In 2021 he became professor of Psychology Department at Stellenbosch University.

Books
Why Men Hurt Women and Other Reflections on Love, Violence and Masculinity
The World Looks Likes This From Here: Thoughts on African Psychology (2019, Wits Press)
Engaging Youth in Activism, Research and Pedagogical Praxis: Transnational and Intersectional Perspectives on Gender, Sex, and Race (2018, Routledge)
Liberating Masculinities (2016, HSRC Press)
There was this Goat: Investigating the Truth Commission Testimony of Notrose Nobomvu Konile (2009, University of Kwazulu-Natal Press)
From Boys to Men: Social Constructions of Masculinity in Contemporary Society (2007, University of Cape Town Press)
Intergroup Relations: South African Perspectives (2006, Juta Academic)
Self, Psychology and Community (2004, University of Cape Town Press)
Social Psychology: Identities & Relationships (2003, University of Cape Town Press)

References

Living people
South African psychologists
1969 births
Date of birth missing (living people)
Academic staff of the University of South Africa
South African non-fiction writers
Place of birth missing (living people)